Dumchele
or Dhumtsele
()
is a village and a grazing area near the Line of Actual Control between Ladakh and Tibet, administered by China since October 1962 but claimed by India. The locale is in the disputed Demchok sector, about 50 kilometers northwest from Demchok and 50 kilometers southeast of Chushul. It lies on a historic trade route between Ladakh and Rutog, with an erstwhile border pass at Chang La or Shingong La to the southeast of Dumchele.

A river flows below the Chang La pass, collecting mountain streams from the north. A rich grazing ground is formed near the pass, called Kigunaru,
and the river itself is called Kigunaru river. It is also called Shingong Lungpa.

Until 1962 India maintained a 'forward' post at Chang La, a day's march from Dumchele. In the 1962 war, China attacked the post and forced India to withdraw from the entire Kigunaru river basin. At the present time, China maintains a border trading market at Dumchele and a military post nearby.

Geography 

Dumchele is at present a trading village for cross-border trade in Chinese-administered part of the northern Demchok sector. Traditionally, it was a grazing area. The Indus valley here is about four miles wide, and sandy with a thin layer of grass. That, coupled with the fact that there is no snow here in winter, makes it a most important winter grazing area for the Changpa nomads. The Ladakhis call this area Skakjung (or Kokzhung).

The present Dumchele village is on the bank of a mid-sized lake, which is apparently fed by a strand of the Kigunaru River (or Shingong Lungpa). The river flows down from the mountains of the Kailash Range forming the eastern watershed of the Indus Valley. It passes by the Chang La pass, where it makes a 90 degree bend, and flows west through a gap in the Kailash Range into the Indus valley. Afterwards, it gets "divided by an island", with a strand flowing straight, and another flowing north parallel to the Indus river. The north-flowing strand gathers into the Dumchele lake, which appears to be endorheic. The formation of the lake appears to be a recent phenomenon as it is not shown on any maps prior to 1960.

To the west of Dumchele is an older, more natural lake called Tsoskur. The Line of Actual Control between the Indian and Chinese-administered parts in this sector runs between the two lakes.

History 

The Dumchele plain lies along a trade route between Lahaul and Rudok, which is known at least since the 17th century. The Ladakhis also used this route on occasion, even though their main route was via Chushul (called the "Junglam").

British Raj 

Moorcroft's associate, George Trebeck, visited the area in early 19th century, travelling south on the right bank of Indus. He stayed at a place called Chibra very near Dumchele. The area was studded with small ponds and lakes, and a rivulet crossed the Indus bed (Kigunaru river, also called Xingong Lungpa), getting divided by an island. He described the Indus river bed as consisting of loose sand, with a form of sand-grass called Long-ma growing on it. It provided winter grazing for the Ladakhis, apparently the only winter grazing available in the whole of Rupshu. He also noticed a trading party belonging to the Kalon of Ladakh return from Rudok, carrying fifty-six sheep loads of shawl wool (pashm) and further loads of coarse wool.

The border of Ladakh was described to Trebeck as running from "the angle of a hill about five miles to the east"  to the low pass of La Ganskiel (the "Lagankhel" of later maps).

Scholar Janet Rizvi confirms that traders often travelled with donkeys via Chang La to Rudok and returned with salt and wool. Ladakhi monks that went to Tibet for education and training also used the route, travelling with traders.

In 1847, Henry Strachey visited the left bank of  Indus, as part of a British boundary commission for Kashmir. In contrast to Trebeck's testimony, he found that Ladakh's territory stretched up to a rivulet flowing into the Indus next to the Demchok. The Tibetan guards at Demchok did not allow him to proceed beyond this point.

After conducting Kashmir Survey between 1855 and 1865, the British government published a Kashmir Atlas, with a defined border. This border ignored Strachey's findings and tried to represent Trebeck's information. It excluded Demchok on the left bank of Indus, leaving the border at Lagankhel, and excluded all the right bank up to the confluence of the Kigunaru river. In between Lagankhel and Kigunaru river, the border ran along the Indus river itself. (See the map by the US Army Map Service.)

Kashmir's geologist Frederic Drew created a map in connection with his book, The Jummoo and Kashmir Territories, in 1875. His border, professedly based on the territories actually used by the Ladakhis and Tibetans for grazing, placed the Chang La ("Chang Pass") and the entire basin of the Kigunaru river within Ladakh.

Despite the various British efforts at border definition, the situation on the ground was essentially unchanged. The state of Kashmir was ruled by a native Maharaja who enjoyed considerable autonomy. The traditional borders appear to have continued until the time of India's independence in 1947.

1962 war and aftermath 
In October 1962, during the Sino-Indian War, the Chinese occupied the Dumchele area, along with the entire right bank of the Indus to the south of Dumchele. The Line of Actual Control resulting from the war runs between Dumchele and the smaller lake of Tsoskur to the west.

During and following the Indo-Pakistan war of 1965, the Dumchele area saw some action mainly in the form of the Indian and Chinese governments exchanging notes blaming each other for intruding into their territory.
The Chinese alleged that India had committed its "worst border provocation since 1962" at Dumchele.

Trading post 
China built a border trading post at Dumchele, meant for the Ladakhis to access. The PLA military stationed near Dumchele allows this trade. For a few days during the winter the trade intensifies. A 2014 study by Siddiq Wahid reports "illicit trade" (smuggling) of "tiger bones, tiger skins, rhino horns and sandalwood". Items exchanged also include rice, wheat and cooking oil, and in exchange pashmina shawls and Chinese crockery and electronics are acquired. In 2016, the smuggling occurring here, said to be worth crores of rupees, was reportedly stopped by Indian authorities.

Locations 
Areas between Dumchele and Demchok such as Nagtsang, Nakung, and Lungma-Serding, Skakjung are China administered territories. Kegu Naro is a day's march from Dumchele.

Notes

References

Bibliography 
 
 
 Indian Report: ; ; ; 
 Chinese report: ; ; ;

External links 
 Lack of infra forcing people to migrate from frontier, The Tribune, 17 July 2019. Contains a photograph of the Dumchele village.

Demchok sector